Richview, formally known as Willowridge-Martingrove-Richview, is a neighbourhood in the city of Toronto, Ontario, Canada. It is bounded on the west by Highway 401 and on the north by the highway and by Dixon Road, Royal York Road on the east, and Eglinton Avenue West along the south. Richview was originally established as a postal village within the then-agricultural Etobicoke Township, which later became the suburb of Etobicoke.

History
One part of the existing neighbourhood predates the suburbanization of the area.

The first settler was William Knaggs who established his home and farm near Rich view Side road (Eglinton) and red Concession (Highway 427) in 1818. A later settler, Christopher Kit Thirkle, gave the areas earlier name Kit's Corners.

Richview began in 1852 when a post office called "Richview" opened in this area.  Richview gave its name to the proposed Richview Expressway.

Richview United Church was built in 1888, by demolished in 1960s leaving only the church cemetery.

Demographics
Major ethnic populations (2016):
 59.9% White; 19.3% Italian, 11.1% English
 13.3% Black; 3.5% Jamaican
 10.6% South Asian
 6.3% East Indian
 4.2% Latin American (of any race)

Education

Four public school boards operate elementary schools in the neighbourhood, Conseil scolaire Viamonde (CSV), Conseil scolaire catholique MonAvenir (CSCM), the Toronto Catholic District School Board (TCDSB), and the Toronto District School Board (TDSB). They include:

All Saints Catholic School, TCDSB
Dixon Grove Junior Middle School, TDSB
École élémentaire catholique Notre-Dame-de-Grâce, CSCM
École élémentaire Félix-Leclerc, CSV
Father Serra Catholic School, TCDSB
Hilltop Middle School, TDSB
Parkfield Junior School, TDSB
St. Eugene Catholic School, TCDSB
St. Marcellus Catholic School, TCDSB
Transfiguration of Our Lord Catholic School, TCDSB
Valleyfield Junior School, TDSB
Westway Junior School, TDSB

The Toronto District School Board is the only school board with secondary schools in the neighbourhood, which include Central Etobicoke High School, Kipling Collegiate Institute, and Scarlett Heights Entrepreneurial Academy. Richview Collegiate Institute a secondary school that bears the name of the neighbourhood, is situated next to the neighbourhood, on the south side of Eglinton Avenue.

Communities
There are several small neighbourhoods within Richview. Willowridge covers the triangle at the far west of the neighbourhood west of Martin Grove. The Westway, also known as St. Phillip's is a community that covers the northeast portion of Richview, east of Kipling and north of The Westway. Martin Grove Gardens is the area bounded by Kipling, The Westway, Martin Grove, and Dixon. Richmond Gardens and Royal York Gardens are neighbourhoods in the southeast portion of Richview, south of The Westway and east of Kipling.

Institutions
Richview Library (Etobicoke Central Branch)
Richview Residence for Seniors
Richview Reservoir

Shopping Centres

1500 Royal York Road Plaza
Martingrove Plaza
Richview Square
Westway Centre

Parks

Alex Marchetti Park
Denfield Park
Green Meadows Park
LIon's Gate Park
Martin Grove Gardens Park
Redgrave Park
Richview Park
Silvercreek Park
Stonehouse Park
Valleyfield Park
Westgrove Park
Westway Park
Widdicombe Hill Park
Willowridge Park
Wincott Park

Churches

All Saints Catholic Churc
First Church of Christ, Scientist
HIlltop Chapel
Richview Baptist Church
Royal York Baptist Church
St. Matthias' Anglican Church
St Wilfred Anglican Church
Transfiguration of Our Lord Catholic Church
Westway United Church
Westway Christian Church

Transportation
The Toronto Transit Commission (TTC) runs a number of buses through the Richview community that connect commuters to Kipling, Islington and Royal York subway stations on the Bloor-Danforth line.
Islington Avenue is served by the 37 and 311 Islington buses.
Kipling Avenue is served by the 45 Kipling bus route.
Martin Grove Road is served by the 46 Martin Grove bus.
Royal York Road is served by the 73 Royal York bus.

The TTC also has bus service along Dixon Road, Eglinton Avenue West and the Westway. These bus routes connect people to Eglinton West and Lawrence West subway stations on the Yonge-University-Spadina line.
Dixon Road is served by the 52 A, B and D Lawrence West bus routes.
Eglinton Avenue is served by the 32 and 307 Eglinton West buses.
The Westway is served by the 52G Lawrence West bus route.

Traveling by car is convenient, as highways 401, 427 and 409 are nearby. The proposed Eglinton West LRT extension will connect the neighbourhood to the Toronto Pearson Airport, as well as Midtown Toronto and Scarborough.

Notable residents
Rob Ford, former Mayor of Toronto
Stephen Harper, former Prime Minister of Canada (attended Richview Collegiate Institute)
Doug Ford, Premier of Ontario (attended Scarlett Heights)

See also
 List of neighbourhoods in Toronto

References

External links
 Willowridge-Martingrove-Richview demographics

Etobicoke
Neighbourhoods in Toronto
Populated places established in 1852
1852 establishments in Canada